Gaura Census Town is a Census Town situated in Jaunpur district of Uttar Pradesh, India. It is the most populous Census Town in the Jaunpur district. The nearest railway station is yadvendra nagar railway station which is located approximately 8 km away.

Demographics
The total population of Gaura consists of 5,618 people, amongst them 2,839 are males and 2,779 are females.

References

Census towns in Jaunpur district